An oi-zuki [oiˌzɯki] (Japanese 追 い 突 き) (in Wadō-Ryū: Jun-Zuki, Japanese 順 突 き) is an equal-sided punch  used in budo disciplines such as karate or jujitsu.

This is an embodiment of the choku-zuki with foot movement. In addition to the block techniques, the Oi-Zuki  is one of the first techniques a student learns. The oi-zuki is the counterpart to the gyaku-zuki (fist punch with the side whose leg is not straight at the front).

Due to the long movement, the oi-zuki is rarely used in competition. It is mainly found in katas and elementary school techniques.

References

Karate techniques